Northwest Vista College is a public community college in San Antonio, Texas. It is one of five community college institutions that comprise the Alamo Colleges District and is located in the Westover Hills neighborhood of San Antonio's Far West Side. Established in 1995 with a dozen students, Northwest Vista College has an enrollment of more than 17,000 students and offers associate degrees and technical certifications.

History
The college was established after a land donation by the World Savings and Loan Association in 1994.  The campus was established on June 20, 1995. Northwest Vista College officially opened in the fall of 1995 as one of the newest additions to the Alamo Community College District. Classes were offered at the Northside Independent School District and at partner corporation sites. Enrollment that first semester was 12 students.  At the time, the Semiconductor Manufacturing Technology program, designed by the college and several corporate sponsors, was the lead program during the college's early years.  (The program is no longer offered.)  With over 800 students enrolled in classes being held at various businesses and schools in Westover Hills and the surrounding area during its early stages, the college started to expand.

The groundbreaking for the construction of the  Northwest Vista College campus was held in November 1996. On July 3, 1997, the Alamo Community College Board awarded the $19,300,000 contract for the new Northwest Vista College Campus in Westover Hills.  Construction began later that month on Phase One of the college's campus development plan, which included construction of four buildings.

Northwest Vista College moved to its current location in northwest San Antonio on October 17, 1998, with Mountain Laurel Hall as the first building open, and opened in October 1999 with the completion of Manzanillo Hall and Huisache Hall.  Northwest Vista College had an enrollment of 2,500 students during their first full year of operation.

The college achieved Candidacy status for accreditation in June 1999 and in August of that year, began a rigorous self-study. At the completion of the self-study, a 12-member accreditation team visited the college in October 2000 for four days—reviewing documentation and interviewing faculty, staff, students, district personnel, community members and trustees of the Alamo Community College District. The committee made ten recommendations, to which the college had to submit a written response to the Southern Association of Colleges and Schools (SACS) by mid-April. This report was reviewed by the Commission on Colleges of the Southern Association of Colleges and Schools, which granted Northwest Vista College initial accreditation shortly afterwards.

At its meeting on June 21, 2001, SACS granted initial accreditation to Northwest Vista College. The accreditation is retroactive to January 1, 2001.

In November 2005, Bexar County voters approved a $450 million bond proposal to meet the needs of the Alamo Community College District's growing student enrollment. Northwest Vista College was allocated $106 million to address and support the extraordinary growth in the northwest area of San Antonio. The district’s newly revised master plan included construction of seven new buildings and parking to accommodate over 14,000 students by 2010.

Two buildings were added in the fall of 2008.  These were Juniper Hall and Redbud Learning Center.  The buildings were accompanied by the newly built campus lake known as "Lago Vista."  In the spring of 2009 two additional buildings were added to the lineup across the lake.  The two new buildings, Live Oak Hall and Cypress Campus Center, were home to additional classrooms and a cafeteria.

In March 2009, the Alamo Community College District changed its name to specifically the "Alamo Colleges."  This was done to enhance marketability.  Due to the district name change as well as a new equality specific campaign, the logos of all the colleges in the district were changed.  Northwest Vista College's logo was changed to the new district logo with a purple Alamo.

Currently, there are over 10,000 students taking courses at Northwest Vista College in a traditional daytime classroom setting as well as evening, Internet, hybrid and weekend courses.

NVC opened the Palmetto Center for the Arts in the fall of 2009 to house the campus fine arts disciplines.

Academics
Students attending Northwest Vista can pursue a wide range of subjects. As a community college, NVC offers programs in Associate of Arts (AA), Associate of Science (AS), Associate of Arts in Teaching (AAT), Associate of Applied Science (AAS), Certificates of Completion, and Marketable Skills Awards.

Enrolled students also have the option to take courses that are transferable to many institutions of higher education.  The college has several articulation agreements with the nearby universities such as the University of Texas at San Antonio, Texas State University–San Marcos, and the University of the Incarnate Word.  These 2+2 articulation agreements serve to facilitate the admission and academic transfer of students from participating Community Colleges like NVC to a participating 4 year college or university within the state of Texas.

The current catalog of Northwest Vista College consists of a 46-hour core curriculum mandated by the Texas Higher Education Coordinating Board (THECB).  The THECB requires that all public colleges and universities in Texas instill at least 42 hours of core curriculum studies into a student's degree plan.  By completing NVC's core curriculum, students are allowed to transfer to any public institution in Texas without the worry of loss of credit in the transfer process.  As long as the core curriculum is completed, the satisfying courses will transfer as a block and the student will not be required to take any more courses at the transfer institution unless the THECB has approved a larger core curriculum at that institution.

Campus life
Students at NVC can participate in many clubs and organizations while on campus.  Usually, every semester there is a specific event known as "Club Rush" in which the many clubs and organizations on campus try to promote their activities while recruiting new members.  New clubs and organizations are frequently added every semester as students come up with new ideas for these.  The Wildcat Activities Center, currently located in the Cypress Campus Center, agrees to support the organization provided a sufficient number of members join.

Currently, there are only three distinct honor societies at the college.  These are  Phi Theta Kappa Honor Society, the National Society of Leadership and Success (Sigma Alpha Pi) and Psi Beta (national honor society for psychology majors at community colleges).  A fourth honor society, the English Honor Society known as Sigma Kappa Delta is planning on starting a chapter soon at NVC.  Also, the College Ambassadors program provides an extensive leadership position at NVC.

Northwest Vista sponsors four club sports teams: Men's basketball, Women's basketball, Women's Volleyball, Co-Ed Cross Country, and most recently Men's Soccer. These teams are all under the Texas Collegiate Club Sports League.

The college also sponsors many events on campus and the local community during the academic school year.  Some events include an annual job fair, usually referred to as "Career Expo," as well as the annual Fiesta events on campus, and the "End of Semester Bash."

Accreditation
Northwest Vista College is accredited by the Commission on Colleges of the Southern Association of Colleges and Schools to award degrees in Associate of Arts, Associate of Science, Associate of Applied Science, and Certificates of Completion. Northwest Vista College is also approved by the Texas Higher Education Coordinating Board and the American Society of Health-System Pharmacists.

Campus buildings
Originally one building, Northwest Vista now has several buildings housing classrooms, student service centers and offices. The buildings are as follows:

Mountain Laurel Hall
Mountain Laurel Hall (MLH) was the first building constructed on campus.  It was originally known as the Academic Building before its name change.  Mountain Laurel Hall was home to the original classrooms as well as the original computer labs, math tutoring lab, and English writing lab.  The building now houses the Engineering and Computer Science departments on the second floor. The first floor classrooms are used for mathematics, science, foreign language and social sciences, among others. The campus lost and found office is here as well.

Manzanillo Hall

Manzanillo Hall (MZH) was originally the building of the president's office, business office, and library on its second floor.  It also provided offices for student services such as advising, and the career and transfer center.  Manzanillo Hall underwent a renovation and is now the campus administration center.

Huisache Hall
Huisache Hall (HH) was the former site of the cafeteria as well as the bookstore.  Classrooms and small gyms occupied the second floor.  It also included the Wildcat Activities Center as well as the student lounges, banquet room, and campus clinic (all of which were moved to the new Cypress Campus Center).  It was originally known as the "College Commons" since it was a place of gathering for many of the events happening at NVC.  The building was closed after the addition of the new buildings and was completely renovated for the kinesiology department, which includes large gyms complete with basketball courts and a track.

Pecan Hall
Pecan Hall (PH) is home to many of the colleges community-based programs.  While it is a site for several classrooms which include several dance classes, the building mainly serves as the college's workforce education and community enrichment center.

Texas Persimmon Physical Plant
The Texas Persimmon Physical Plant (TPER) is the site for the on-campus police station and a UPS Store.

Boardwalk
The Boardwalk (BDWK) is home to many of the campus's additional classrooms.  Formerly known as the "G Buildings," the boardwalk is located just behind Huisache Hall and Juniper Hall.  The boardwalk includes several patio areas within it and mainly serves as additional classrooms.

Juniper Hall
Juniper Hall (JH) officially opened for classes in August 2008.  The building houses four tutoring labs: On the first floor are the integrated reading and writing lab, plus a campus open computer lab. A college level English writing lab is on the second floor, and two math tutoring labs are on the third floor. Juniper Hall is also home to the department offices for Mathematics and English, and most of the classes held in the building are for those subjects as well.

Redbud Learning Center

Redbud Learning Center (RLC) opened alongside Juniper Hall.  The building houses the campus library and tutoring labs on the second floor. The digital media department is on the third floor, while the campus coffee shop, known as the "Cyber Cafe" which brews Starbucks coffee, is adjacent to the library on the first floor.

Live Oak Hall
Across Lago Vista from Juniper Hall is Live Oak Hall (LOH), which officially opened in January 2009.  It houses the disciplines of natural sciences, social sciences, humanities and speech. The first floor has a tutoring lab for speech, while the science tutoring lab is on the second floor. The third floor is home to new science class labs. The astronomy deck built on its roof is used for astronomy courses to view the sky.

Cypress Campus Center
Opening alongside Live Oak Hall was the Cypress Campus Center (CCC).  Cypress Campus Center is home to the campus cafeteria, Wildcat Activities Center (which is the main office for student organizations), and the bookstore. It also houses the new student advising center, business office, Veterans Affairs, and career and transfer (CaTS) center.

Palmetto Fine and Performing Arts Center
The Palmetto Center for the Arts opened in 2009. The building houses an auditorium, black box theater, smaller performance hall, dance studio, gallery lobby, practice rooms and other fine and performing arts department equipment and facilities.

Prickly Pear Parking Garage
As a commuter college, Northwest Vista's isolated location, limited public transportation access and explosive growth has resulted in heavy demands for parking. To relieve some of the congestion, the college opened a new multi-level parking garage for student and staff use in the fall of 2014. It is located behind Huisache Hall.

Dual credit
NVC has partnered with Northside Independent School District to provide college courses to eligible high school juniors and seniors. These courses known as "Dual Credit" will provide students with high school credit along with college hours that are transferable to four-year colleges and universities. These courses include, but are not limited to: Pre-Calculus, Calculus, English, U.S. History, and Government.

References

External links

 Official website

Two-year colleges in the United States
Educational institutions established in 1995
Universities and colleges accredited by the Southern Association of Colleges and Schools
Universities and colleges in San Antonio
Alamo Colleges District
1995 establishments in Texas